Shahidullah means "witness of Allah". It may refer to:

People

Given name
 Shah Shahidullah Faridi (1915–1978), English writer
 Shahidullah Kaiser (1927–1971), Bangladeshi novelist
 Shahidullah (cricketer) (born 1999), Afghan cricketer

Surname
 Muhammad Shahidullah (1885–1969), Bengali linguist, polyglot, and educator

Places
 Xaidulla, a small settlement on the old caravan route between Ladakh and Yarkand

Others
 Shahidullah Hall,  a residential hall of the University of Dhaka